FOX Soul is a digital television network and live streaming service operated by FOX Television Stations that launched on January 13, 2020. Featuring original and syndicated programs including The Sharpton Sisters, Brutally Honest with Jasmine Brand, Crockett's Corner, Cocktails with Queens , The Book of Sean and The Business of Being Black with Tammi Mac, FOX Soul presents content that pertains to the African-American experience. The network also includes programs about the achievements of past and present African-Americans, for instance The Uprising. FOX Soul is the first streaming service launched by Fox Corporation.

Fox Soul is accessed by audiences across various digital streaming platforms including YouTube, YouTube TV, FOX Now, Samsung +, Roku, Tubi, Amazon Fire TV, The Web, Apple TV, Stirr, FuboTV, iOs, Android, Twitter, Facebook, Instagram.

In May 2021, with a reported 44-million count of viewers, FOX Soul was greenlit to expand its Black culture-fuelled programming. With James DuBose holding the seat of Head of Programming, the streaming service entered into its second season.

On September 30, 2022, Deadline Hollywood published word of FOX Soul's further expansion with a return of original FOX Soul flagship series on the network including The Black Report, The Book of Sean (hosted by Rev. Dr. Sean H. McMillian), The Business of Being Black with Tammi Mac, Cocktails with the Queens (co-hosted by Claudia Jordan, Vivica A. Fox, LisaRaye McCoy and Syleena Johnson), TEA-G-I-F (co-hosted by Claudia Jordan, Al Reynolds and Funky Dineva aka Quentin Latham).

Original programming 
 One on One with Keyshia Cole — Hosted by Keyshia Cole
 The Book of Sean — Hosted by Dr. Sean McMillan
 Choppin’ It Up with Mike and Donny — Hosts: Mike Hill and Donny Harrell
 The Tammi Mac Late Show — Host: Tammi Mac
 Turnt Out With Ts Madison - Host: Ts Madison 
 Out Loud with Claudia Jordan — Hosted by Claudia Jordan
 Fox Soul’s Screening Room —  Hosted by Vivica A. Fox
 Fox Soul’s Black Report
 Tea-G-I-F - Hosted by Claudia Jordan, Funky Dineva, and Al Reynolds
 Fox Soul Deals
 Chatter
 Cocktails With Queens - Hosted by Claudia Jordan, LisaRaye, Vivica A. Fox, and Syleena Johnson
 Hollywood Unlocked With Jason Lee Uncensored
 The Mix
 Kingz With Kosine
 Worth A Conversation with Jay "Jeezy" Jenkins — Hosted by Jeezy
 Quarantine Cook-Off with Rickey Smiley  — Host: Rickey Smiley
 Established with Angela Yee —  Hosted by Angela Yee
 Get Into It With Tami Roman — Hosted by Tami Roman

Fox Television Stations syndicated programming 
 Dish Nation – syndicated entertainment news show
The Real
 Street Soldiers with Lisa Evers – Community issues and music news from WNYW/New York, hosted by Lisa Evers
 Later with Leon – Comedic view of the news airing in late night on WFLD/Chicago, hosted by Leon Rogers
 The Feed At Night – Pop culture, comedy and news airing in late night on WTXF/Philadelphia, hosted by Alex Holley and Thomas Drayton
 Isiah Factor: Uncensored –  Late night news and pop culture show on KRIV/Houston, hosted by Isiah Carey
 Divorce Court

References 

Fox Television Stations
African-American television networks
Fox network affiliates
2020 establishments in the United States
2020 in American television
Television channels and stations established in 2020
Internet television channels
directors